The 2012 German Masters were held from January 27 to 29 at the Curling Club Hamburg in Hamburg, Germany as part of the 2011–12 World Curling Tour. The tournament was held in a round robin format. The purse for the tournament was €15,000.

Teams
The teams are listed as follows:

Round robin standings

Tiebreakers

Playoffs

References

External links

 

German Masters
Masters (curling)
Sports competitions in Hamburg
Curling competitions in Germany